Vinh is the capital of Nghệ An Province in Vietnam.

Vinh may also refer to:

Events 
 The Vinh wiretap, an American espionage operation of the Vietnam War

People 
 Monique Vinh Thuy (born 1944),  widow of the last Emperor of Vietnam, Bảo Đại
 Lê Công Vinh (born 1985), Vietnamese footballer

Places 
 Trà Vinh Province, a province in Vietnam
 Vinh International Airport, an aviation facility in Vietnam
 Vĩnh Long, a city and the capital of Vĩnh Long Province in Vietnam
 Vĩnh Long Airfield, a United States military base
 Vịnh Mốc tunnels, tunnel complex in Vietnam
 Vĩnh Phúc Province, a province in Vietnam
 Vinh station, a railway station in Vietnam
 Vinh University, a school in Vietnam
 Vinh Stadium, a multi-use facility in Vietnam

See also 
 Vĩnh Bình (disambiguation)
 Vĩnh Hưng (disambiguation)
 Vinh Thanh (disambiguation)